Yohoia is an extinct genus of megacheiran arthropod from the Cambrian period that has been found as fossils in the Burgess Shale formation of British Columbia, Canada. It has been placed among the arachnomorpha, a group of arthropods that includes the chelicerates and possibly the trilobites. Fossils range in size from 7 to 23 mm. 711 specimens of Yohoia are known from the Greater Phyllopod bed, where they comprise 1.35% of the community.

Yohoia is one of the "great appendage" arthropods. All taxa have a single pair of large pre-oral jointed limbs  with branched spiny ends for grasping, impaling, or filtering food items. "Great appendage" arthropods have been seen as a polyphyletic group where the appendage has independently evolved, or as a Class Megacheira including Yohoia (with Leanchoilia, Alalcomenaeus, Oestokerkus, Fortiforceps, Jianfengia, Yawunik) defined as euarthropods, plus the radiodonts, defined as a sister group to arthropods. Yohoia-like genera are small and have biramous limbs with a walking segment, while radiodonts are larger animals without limbs except for the great appendage. (Although biramous limbs have been described in the Devonian radiodont Schinderhannes, this interpretation is highly questioned and it is more likely to be bands of gill lamellae instead.)

Specimens of Yohoia have a head shield which is followed by 13 trunk tergites, or plates. On both sides, the bottom side of the first 10 of these ended in backward-pointing, triangular points or projections. The last three plates were complete tubes, circling the entire trunk. At the end of the trunk was a paddle-like tail. There were also a pair of large extensions at the front of the head shield. They had a pronounced "elbow" and ended in four long spines, looking rather like fingers. There were three appendages on the bottom of the head shield on each side, and these are assumed to have supported the creature on the sandy or silty sea bottom. There were also single appendages hanging down under the body plates which were flap-like and fringed with setae, probably used for swimming and respiration. Specimens also show some bulbous formations at the front of the head shield that may have served as eyes.

Yohoia is assumed to have been a mainly benthic (bottom-dwelling) creature that swam just above the muddy ocean floor, using its appendages to scavenge or capture prey.

References

External links 
 "Yohoia tenuis". Burgess Shale Fossil Gallery. Virtual Museum of Canada. 2011. (Burgess Shale species 135)

Burgess Shale fossils
Megacheira
Prehistoric arthropod genera
Burgess Shale animals
Taxa named by Charles Doolittle Walcott
Cambrian arthropods
Cambrian genus extinctions